Wherryman's Way is a long-distance footpath in the English county of Norfolk.

Route
It follows the course of the River Yare where possible, with some significant stretches away from the river where there is no continuous path alongside the Yare. Where the River Chet meets the Yare, it follows the former upstream to Loddon and then largely uses roads to the Reedham Ferry to cross the River Yare. 

From Reedham the route is along the northern bank of the Yare the rest of the way, passing Berney Arms where it joins the route of the Weavers' Way. The two routes then follow the northern edge of Breydon Water before going under Breydon Bridge and into Great Yarmouth. By Vauxhall Bridge next to Great Yarmouth railway station a sculpture marks the end points of the Wherryman's Way, Weavers' Way and Angles Way. 

The trail is named after the trading wherries that used the River Yare to travel inland to Norwich.

Media
In September, 2011 Future Radio broadcast a 5-episode series of documentaries about the Wherryman's Way. This was funded by the Broads Authority Sustainable Development Fund.

External links
 Wherryman's Way Official Website
 Wherryman's Way Blog
 Wherryman's Way on the Norfolk County Council website.
 Map of the trail on the Norfolk County Council website.

References

Further reading

Footpaths in Norfolk
Long-distance footpaths in England